Youpi may refer to:

 Youppi!, the official mascot of the Montreal Expos (1979–2004) and the Montreal Canadiens (2005–present) 
 Youpi, a cartoon English Cocker Spaniel from Pierre Probst's Caroline series of children's books
 Youpi! L'école est finie, a children programming block on La Cinq 
 Menthuthuyoupi, nicknamed "Youpi",  a fictional character in the manga series Hunter × Hunter

See also
 Whoopee (disambiguation)
 Yahoo (disambiguation)